Louis de Rigaud de Vaudreuil (Revel, 17 October 1728 – 1810) was a French Navy officer. He served in the War of American Independence.

Biography 
Rigaud de Vaudreuil was born a younger son of Louis-Philippe de Rigaud de Vaudreuil (1691–1763), and brother to Louis-Philippe de Rigaud (1724–1802). He joined the Navy as a Garde-Marine in 1743. He was promoted to Ensign in 1746, to Lieutenant in 1756, and to Captain in 1777.

In 1747, he served on the brand-new 74-gun Intrépide, along with his elder brother.

In 1772, he was first officer on the 50-gun Fier.

In 1777, he was commanding the 74-gun Fendant, in Brest. Navy Minister Sartine had chosen her to be one of the six ships held ready for immediate departure at all times.

Between March 1780 and 28 February 1781, he commanded Magnanime, on a cruise between Belle-Ile, Rochefort, La Rochelle and Brest,

In 1781, Vaudreuil was captain of the brand-new 74-gun Sceptre, in the White Squadron of the fleet under De Grasse.
 He captained her at the Battle of the Chesapeake on 5 September 1781, and at the Battle of the Saintes.

On 12 January 1782, Vaudreuil was promoted to Chef d'Escadre, and put in charge of the squadron of Rochefort. He was promoted to contre-amiral on 1 January 1792, and to Vice-amiral on 1 July 1792.

Sources and references 
 Notes

Citations

References
 
 
 
 
 

 

External links
 

French Navy officers
French military personnel of the American Revolutionary War